Diego Silva Patriota (born 22 August 1986), commonly known as Diego or Diego Patriota, is a Brazilian footballer who currently plays as a midfielder for Liga de Elite club Chao Pak Kei.

Club career
Having started his career with Sport Club do Recife of his hometown, Patriota moved to Croatia to join third division Junak Sinj in 2007. He returned to Brazil and played for Boavista and Central before joining Mixto in 2010. He also played for Sergipe in 2009.

After a short spell with Chã Grande, he joined Sampaio Corrêa in 2011. He next played for Ypiranga, where he made 6 appearances in the Campeonato Pernambucano, before joining Hermann Aichinger and then eventually moving to Macau to join Windsor Arch Ka I.

He joined Chao Pak Kei for the 2014 season, and was one of the league's top scorers in 2015 and was voted the league's best player.

Patriota won Best Player of the Year Award again in 2018, after leading Chao Pak Kei to 2018 Macau FA Cup victory.

Honours

Club
Chao Pak Kei
 Liga de Elite: 2019, 2021, 2022
 Taça de Macau: 2018, 2021

Career statistics

Club

Notes

References

External links
Diego Silva Patriota at HKFA

1986 births
Living people
Brazilian footballers
Brazilian expatriate footballers
Association football forwards
Sport Club do Recife players
NK Junak Sinj players
Boavista Sport Club players
Central Sport Club players
Club Sportivo Sergipe players
Mixto Esporte Clube players
Sampaio Corrêa Futebol Clube players
Clube Atlético Hermann Aichinger players
Brazilian expatriate sportspeople in Macau
Expatriate footballers in Macau
Hong Kong First Division League players
Expatriate footballers in Hong Kong
Chao Pak Kei players
Sportspeople from Recife
Liga de Elite players